Transport infrastructure within Chad is generally poor, especially in the north and east of the country.  River transport is limited to the south-west corner. As of 2011 Chad had no railways though two lines are planned - from the capital to the Sudanese and Cameroonian borders during the wet season, especially in the southern half of the country.  In the north, roads are merely tracks across the desert and land mines continue to present a danger.  Draft animals (horses, donkeys and camels) remain important in much of the country.

Fuel supplies can be erratic, even in the south-west of the country, and are expensive. Elsewhere they are practically non-existent.

Railways 

As of 2011 Chad had no railways. Two lines were planned to Sudan and Cameroon from the capital, with construction expected to start in 2012. 
No operative lines were listed as of 2019.

In 2021, an ADB study was funded for that rail link from Cameroon to Chad.

Highways 

As at 2018 Chad had a total of 44,000 km of roads of which approximately 260 km are paved. Some, but not all of the roads in the capital N'Djamena are paved. Outside of N'Djamena there is one paved road which runs from Massakory in the north, through N'Djamena and then south, through the cities of Guélengdeng, Bongor, Kélo and Moundou, with a short spur leading in the direction of Kousseri, Cameroon, near N'Djamena.  Expansion of the road towards Cameroon through Pala and Léré is reportedly in the preparatory stages.

Waterways 
As at 2012, Chari and Logone Rivers were navigable only in wet season (2002).  Both flow northwards, from the south of Chad, into Lake Chad.

Pipelines
Since 2003, a 1,070 km pipeline has been used to export crude oil from the oil fields around Doba to offshore oil-loading facilities on Cameroon's Atlantic coast at Kribi.
The CIA World Factbook however cites only 582 km of pipeline in Chad itself as at 2013.

Seaports and harbors 
None (landlocked).

Chad's main routes to the sea are:
 From N'Djamena and the south west of Chad:
 By road to Ngaoundéré, in Cameroon, and then by rail to Douala
 By road to Maiduguri, in Nigeria, and then by rail to Port Harcourt
 From the north and east of Chad:
 By road across the Sahara desert to Libya

In colonial times, the main access was by road to Bangui, in the Central African Republic, then by river boat to Brazzaville, and onwards by rail from Brazzaville to Pointe Noire, on Congo's Atlantic coast. This route is now little used.

There is also a route across Sudan, to the Red Sea, but very little trade goes this way.

Links with Niger, north of Lake Chad, are practically nonexistent; it is easier to reach Niger via Cameroon and Nigeria.

Airports 

 Chad had an estimated 58 airports, only 9 of which had paved runways. In 2015, scheduled airlines in Chad carried approximately 28,332 passengers.

Airports with paved runways 
Statistics on airports with paved runways as of 2017:

List of airports with paved runways:
 Abeche Airport
 Bol Airport
 Faya-Largeau Airport
 Moundou Airport
 N'Djamena International Airport
 Sarh Airport

Airports - with unpaved runways 
Statistics on airports with unpaved runways as of 2013:

Airline 
SAGA Airline of Chad - see http://www.airsaga.com

Ministry of Transport 
The Ministry is represented at the regional level by the Regional Delegations, which have jurisdiction over a part of the National Territory as defined by Decree No. 003 / PCE / CTPT / 91. Their organization and responsibilities are defined by Order No. 006 / MTPT / SE / DG / 92.

The Regional Delegations are:

The Regional Delegation of the Center covering the regions of Batha, Guéra and Salamat with headquarters in Mongo;
The Regional Delegation of the Center-Ouest covering the regions of Chari Baguirmi and Hatier Lamis with headquarters Massakory;
The North-West Regional Delegation covering the Kanem and Lake regions with headquarters in Mao;
The Western Regional Delegation covering the areas of Mayo-East Kebbi, Mayo-West Kebbi and Tandjile with headquarters in Bongor;
The Eastern Regional Delegation covering the regions of Wadi Fira and Ouaddai with headquarters in Abéché;
The South-East Regional Delegation covering the Mandoul and Moyen Chari regions with headquarters in Sarh;
The Southwest Regional Delegation covering the regions of Logone Occidental and Logone Orientai with headquarters in Moundou;
The Northern Regional Delegation covering the BET region with headquarters in Faya.

Each Regional Delegation is organized into regional services, namely:  the Regional Roads Service, the Regional Transport Service, the Civilian Buildings Regional Service and, as needed, other regional services may be established in one or more Delegations .

See also 
 Chad
 Economy of Chad

References

External links 
 
 Maps
 UN Map
 UNHCR Atlas Map